CRLS may refer to:

Cambridge Rindge and Latin School
Cherokee Regional Library System
Chestatee Regional Library System
Conyers-Rockdale Library System